Chatal may refer to:
Chatal, Afghanistan
Chatal, Iran
Ceatalchioi, Romania